The Sound of the Trio is a 1962 live album by the Oscar Peterson Trio, recorded in 1961 at the London House jazz club in Chicago.

Three other Oscar Peterson Trio albums were also released featuring music from the London House concerts: The Trio, Something Warm, and Put On a Happy Face. The complete  sessions were released in 1996 as The London House Sessions.

Track listing
Side One
"Tricrotism" (Originally Tricotism) (Oscar Pettiford) – 11:10
"On Green Dolphin Street" (Bronislaw Kaper, Ned Washington) – 8:55
Side Two
  "Thag's Dance" (Oscar Peterson) – 5:43
"Ill Wind" (Harold Arlen, Ted Koehler) – 5:36
"Kadota's Blues" (Peterson) – 11:15

2000 CD reissue bonus tracks
  "Scrapple from the Apple" (Charlie Parker) – 9:29
"Jim" (Caesar Petrillo, Milton Samuels, Nelson Shawn) – 9:13
"Band Call (Duke Ellington) – 7:47
"The Night We Called It a Day" (Tom Adair, Matt Dennis) – 5:08
"Billy Boy" (Traditional) – 2:35

Personnel
Oscar Peterson - piano
Ray Brown - double bass
Ed Thigpen - drums

References

Oscar Peterson live albums
Albums recorded at The London House, Chicago
Albums produced by Norman Granz
1962 live albums
Verve Records live albums